Transwest Air was a scheduled and charter airline primarily serving the Canadian province of Saskatchewan. Its headquarters and main base was at Prince Albert.

Transwest was formed in 2000 by the merger of Air Sask, established as La Ronge Aviation in 1960, and Athabaska Airways. The company offered not only scheduled passenger services, but fishing charters, surveying work, forest fire fighting, and medevac operations.

Transwest's equipment includes a number of bush planes and helicopters, and four Saab 340 regional turboprop airliners. The company also operates La Ronge Water Aerodrome, Stony Rapids Water Aerodrome, and Southend/Hans Ulricksen  Field Aerodrome. Transwest Air also has maintenance bases in Saskatoon, Prince Albert, La Ronge, and Stony Rapids. Transwest Air was bought by West Wind Aviation on June 30, 2016.

In January 2021, it was announced that West Wind Aviation will be merged with Transwest Air, and would be renamed Rise Air.

History
The company was founded by Floyd Glass, who learned to fly in the late 1930s, then served as a military flying training instructor during the Second World War. Postwar, he was the first general manager of the provincial Crown corporation Saskatchewan Government Airways. He resigned from this post, flew briefly with British Columbia's Queen Charlotte Airways, then returned to Saskatchewan and in 1955 formed his own firm, Athabaska Airways, which still exists under the name "Transwest Air". Glass died in 1999. In June 2016, West Wind Aviation put forward a letter of intent to purchase Transwest Air. The company became a subsidiary of West Wind Aviation on July 1, 2016.

In January 2021, it was announced West Wind Aviation would be merged with Transwest Air and be renamed Rise Air.

Passenger services 
Transwest Air offers scheduled flights to and from:

Saskatchewan
Fond du Lac Dene Nation (Fond-du-Lac Airport)
La Ronge (La Ronge (Barber Field) Airport)
Points North Landing (Points North Landing Airport)
Prince Albert (Prince Albert (Glass Field) Airport)
Saskatoon (Saskatoon John G. Diefenbaker International Airport)
Stony Rapids (Stony Rapids Airport)
Uranium City (Uranium City Airport)
Wollaston Lake (Wollaston Lake Airport)

Fleet
As of August 2019 Transwest Air listed 31 aircraft and had 39 aircraft registered with Transport Canada.

Transport Canada also shows a Bell 206B, a de Havilland Canada DHC-3 Otter, and a Twin Otter Series 100 all with canceled certificates of registration. There is also a Piper PA-31 Navajo listed with a temporary canceled certificate.

Transwest used to operate British Aerospace BAe Jetstream 31 twin turboprop aircraft, the Beechcraft Model 99, the Beechcraft Baron, Beechcraft Travel Air, Cessna 441 Conquest II and the Mitsubishi MU-2.

References

External links 

Company site

Defunct airlines of Canada
Airlines established in 2000
Airlines disestablished in 2021
Air Transport Association of Canada
Companies based in Saskatchewan
Companies established in 2000
Prince Albert, Saskatchewan
Regional airlines of Saskatchewan
Canadian companies established in 2000
2000 establishments in Saskatchewan
Seaplane operators
2000 establishments in Canada
Air Canada